Kottur may refer to:

Kotturu, Karnataka, also known as Kottur, a town in Bellary district in Karnataka, India
 Kotturpuram, a neighbourhood of Chennai, Tamil Nadu, India
Kottur, Kerala, the name of a Gramapanchayath in Kozhikode district, Kerala, India